Barefoot v. Estelle, 463 U.S. 880 (1983), is a United States Supreme Court case. The Court ruled on the admissibility of clinical opinions given by two psychiatrists hired by the prosecution in answer to hypothetical questions regarding the defendant's future dangerousness and the likelihood that he would present a continuing threat to society in this Texas death penalty case. The American Psychiatric Association submitted an amicus curiae brief in support of the defendant's position that such testimony should be inadmissible and urging curtailment of psychiatric testimony regarding future dangerousness and a prohibition of such testimony based on hypothetical data.

In Estelle v. Smith, 451 U.S. 454 (1981), the Supreme Court previously ruled on a Texas death penalty case regarding the use of a psychiatric examination to determine the defendant's competency to stand trial to predict future dangerousness.  In that case the Court held that the Fifth Amendment's privilege against self-incrimination applied to pretrial psychiatric examinations by a prosecution psychiatrist who later testified regarding the defendant's future dangerousness without warning the defendant that such evidence could be used against him. The Court reasoned that although a defendant has no generalized constitutional right to remain silent at a psychiatric examination limited to the issues of sanity or competency, full Miranda warnings must be given with respect to testimony concerning future dangerousness.

Background 
Thomas Barefoot (February 23, 1945 – October 30, 1984) was convicted of the murder of a police officer. The same Texas jury determined, in the sentencing phase of the trial, whether Barefoot should receive the death penalty.

The Texas death-penalty statute required that the jury consider whether Barefoot would pose "future dangerousness".  Along with other evidence, the prosecution called two psychiatrists who, answering hypothetical questions, testified that Barefoot was likely to remain a danger to society. Neither psychiatrist had examined Barefoot nor asked to do so, but each summarized their professional experience as equipping them to answer the questions accurately. One psychiatrist called Barefoot a "criminal sociopath" and said there was no treatment for this condition and that Barefoot was likely to commit acts of violence in the future. The other psychiatrist testified that Barefoot had "a fairly classical, typical, sociopathic personality disorder." He placed Barefoot in the "most severe category" of sociopaths, and on a scale of one to ten, Barefoot was "above ten". The jury considered this as well as other evidence and imposed the death penalty.

The Court ignored amicus briefs arguing that psychiatric evidence cannot be offered on such issues with any reasonable degree of certainty.

Appeals 
Barefoot appealed to the Texas Court of Criminal Appeals which rejected his argument that this use of psychiatric testimony during the sentencing phase of his trial was unconstitutional and upheld the conviction and sentence. After denials of a writ of certiorari and of habeas corpus, petitioner filed a petition for habeas corpus in Federal District Court raising the same objections to the use of psychiatric testimony. Although the District Court rejected his claims and denied the writ, it did issue a certificate of probable cause. The Texas Court of Criminal Appeals denied a second writ of habeas corpus and denied a stay of execution. The Court of Appeals also denied a stay of execution.

The Supreme Court granted certiorari.

Opinion of the Court 
The Supreme Court upheld the denial of a stay of execution by the Court of Appeals, saying that the Court of Appeals followed the procedural guidelines for handling such applications for stays of execution on habeas corpus appeals pursuant to a certificate of probable cause. The Court also upheld the appellate court's finding on the merits of the case, reasoning that that clinical prediction testimony  was not in every case wrong and could be refuted by opposing experts, trusting the adversarial system to determine the accuracy of such statements.

Subsequent developments 
The Court's decision in this death penalty case was very important in influencing the legal opinion regarding psychiatric predictions of dangerousness, a position with which the  American Psychiatric Association and other medical ethicists disagree, leading some experts to conclude that a psychiatrist making such statements verges on the brink of being a quack. Nevertheless, courts have been willing to accept such testimony despite the lack of empirical evidence that these predictions of future dangerousness are accurate.

However, forensic experts state that psychiatric testimony on ultimate questions at law is unreliable due to the inherent limitations of current psychiatric clinical and experimental knowledge and practice. Dr. James P. Grigson, one of the psychiatrists that testified in this case, was expelled from the American Psychiatric Association and the Texas Association of Psychiatric Physicians (TAPP) for making statements in testimony on defendants he had not examined. The TAPP said his expulsion was due not only to his replies to hypothetical questions but also for predicting dangerousness with 100% certainty.

Barefoot was executed on October 30, 1984, at the age of 39.

See also 
 Estelle v. Smith (1981)
 List of people executed in Texas, 1982–1989

Footnotes

External links 
 
 Interview with Attorney Douglas Becker on his role in Barefoot v. Estelle
 Hastings -  Barefoot v. Estelle

United States Supreme Court cases
United States expert witness case law
Mental health law in the United States
1983 in United States case law
United States Supreme Court cases of the Burger Court